Jogendra Laxman Kawade (born 1 April 1943, Nagpur) is an Indian politician, professor and social activist. He is the founder and the president of the Peoples Republican Party. He is one of notable activists in Ambedkarite movement. Kawade was a former MP from Chimur Lok Sabha constituency of Maharashtra in 12th Lok Sabha during 1998-99. He was a former member of Maharashtra Legislative Council.

References

1943 births
Politicians from Nagpur
India MPs 1998–1999
Living people
Lok Sabha members from Maharashtra
Members of the Maharashtra Legislative Council
Marathi politicians
Republican Party of India politicians
People from Chandrapur district
Indian economists
Indian Buddhists